Anamorph and its derivates may refer to:

Biology
Anamorph, a part of the life cycle of fungi in the phyla Ascomycota and Basidiomycota
Anamorphosis (biology), a type of metamorphosis in which an arthropod adds body segments while retaining general form and habits

Art and film

Technologies
Anamorphosis or anamorphic image, where the viewer must use special devices or be in a specific place to see an undistorted image
Anamorphic format, in cinematography, stretching a widescreen picture to fit on 35 mm film
Anamorphic widescreen, in DVD manufacture, horizontally squeezing a widescreen image so it can be stored in a DVD image frame

Titled works
Anamorph (film), a 2007 film by Henry S. Miller
Anamorphosis (EP), by the Norwegian band Drottnar

Other uses
Anamorphism, a concept in computer science

See also
Animorphs, a book series by K. A. Applegate
Animorphs (video game), a 2000 video game based on the series